Bahal is a village in Portibi subdistrict, North Padang Lawas Regency, North Sumatra province, Indonesia. The Vajrayana Buddhist Bahal temple is located in this village.

Temples in Indonesia
Populated places in North Sumatra